Seemanpillai Mudaliar Anantham was a Ceylon Tamil proctor, politician and member of the State Council of Ceylon. 

Anantham was an unofficial magistrate. He contested the 1931 State Council election as an independent candidate in Mannar-Mullaitivu and was elected to the State Council of Ceylon.

References

Ceylonese proctors
Independent politicians in Sri Lanka
Members of the 1st State Council of Ceylon
People from British Ceylon
Sri Lankan justices of the peace
Sri Lankan Tamil lawyers
Sri Lankan Tamil politicians
Year of birth missing
Year of death missing